The burying mantis (Sphodropoda tristis) is a species of mantis native to Australia. They are grey/brown or green, frequently with mottled patterning on the wings, and a have distinctive pale tubercles on the forelegs.  Both sexes can reach lengths of up to 70 mm long. Their common name comes from the behaviour of females, which infrequently bury their oothecae underground.

See also
Mantodea of Oceania
List of mantis genera and species

References

Mantodea
Mantodea of Oceania
Insects of Australia
Insects described in 1871